The Pathfinder-class cruisers were a pair of scout cruisers built for the Royal Navy in the first decade of the 20th century. The sister ships spent much of the first decade of their careers in reserve. The latter ship was badly damaged when the Germans bombarded Hartlepool in December. She spent the rest of the war in British waters. The ship was paid off in 1919 and sold for scrap the following year. Pathfinder was sunk by a German submarine shortly after the war began, the first sinking of a British warship during the war by a German submarine.

Background and description
In 1901–1902, the Admiralty developed scout cruisers to work with destroyer flotillas, leading their torpedo attacks and backing them up when attacked by other destroyers. It accepted four of the submissions and ordered one ship from each builder in the 1902–1903 Naval Programme and a repeat in the following year's programme.

The two ships from Cammell Laird became the Pathfinder class. Four more 12-pounders were added to the specification in August. Their crew consisted of 289 officers and ratings.

The Pathfinder-class ships were powered by a pair of four-cylinder triple-expansion steam engines, each driving one shaft, using steam provided by a dozen Laird-Normand boilers that exhausted into three funnels. Pathfinder slightly exceeded her design speed when she ran her sea trials in 1905. The scout cruisers soon proved too slow for this role as newer destroyers outpaced them.

The main armament of the Pathfinder class consisted of ten QF 12-pounder 18-cwt guns. Three guns were mounted abreast on the forecastle and the quarterdeck, with the remaining four guns positioned port and starboard amidships. They also carried eight QF 3-pounder Hotchkiss guns and two single mounts for 18-inch torpedo tubes, one on each broadside.

Ships

Service
The sisters were in reserve for most of the first decade of their existence. After the beginning of the First World War in August 1914, they were assigned to coastal defence duties on the East Coast of England. Patrol was badly damaged during the German bombardment of Hartlepool in mid-December 1914 when she attempted to exit the harbour during the bombardment. After repairs were completed she remained on coast defence duties until she was transferred to the Irish Sea in 1918. The ship was paid off in 1919 and sold for scrap in 1920.

Pathfinder was originally to have been named Fastnet but the name was changed before construction was started. Leader of the 8th Destroyer Flotilla, she was torpedoed and sunk by the German submarine  in the approaches to the Firth of Forth on 5 August 1914 with the loss of 259 men, giving her the distinction of being the first warship sunk by a submarine.

Notes

Footnotes

Bibliography

External links

Pathfinder class in World War I
History of the Pathfinder class
The Pathfinder class

 
Cruiser classes
Ship classes of the Royal Navy
World War I cruisers of the United Kingdom